Gap Creek is a stream in the U.S. state of South Dakota.

Gap Creek takes its name from nearby Reva Gap.

See also
List of rivers of South Dakota

References

Rivers of Harding County, South Dakota
Rivers of Perkins County, South Dakota
Rivers of South Dakota